Neuman is a surname. People with the surname include:

Alberto Neuman (1933–2021), Argentinian classical pianist
Andrés Neuman (born 1977), Spanish-Argentinian writer and poet
Brandon Neuman, American politician, elected to the Pennsylvania House of Representatives in 2011
Daniel M. Neuman (born 1944), American professor and author
E. Jack Neuman (1921–1998), American writer and producer
Edward Neuman (born 1943), Polish-American mathematician
Gerald L. Neuman, Harvard Law School professor
Henry D. Neuman or Neumann (fl. 1860–1874), German-born American burglar, bank robber and gang leader known as Dutch Heinrichs
Mark Neuman (born 1959), American politician, member of the Alaska House of Representatives
Mic Neuman, American producer, director and television program creator
Michael A. Neuman (born 1955), Canadian business executive
Molly Neuman, American rock drummer
Otto Christian Neuman (1869–1938), American politician, member of the Minnesota House of Representatives
Robert Neuman, professor of art history at Florida State University
Robert S. Neuman (1926–2015), abstract painter
Susan B. Neuman, educator, researcher, professor and education policymaker
W. Russell Neuman, John Derby Evans Professor of Media Technology at the University of Michigan (2001–2013)
William F. Neuman (1919–1981), American biochemist and author

Fictional characters
Alfred E. Neuman, Mad magazine mascot and cover boy

See also
Neumann
Newman

German-language surnames